The Wise Quacking Duck is a 1943 Warner Bros. Looney Tunes cartoon directed by Bob Clampett. The cartoon was released on May 1, 1943, and stars Daffy Duck.

Plot 
The cartoon begins with Mr. Meek (voiced by Darrell Payne) carrying an axe in his hands. He turns to the audience and explains that his wife, Sweetypuss, told him that if he did not bring home a roast duck for dinner, she would 'cook (his) goose'. (A parody of Wallace Wimple and his wife "Sweetie Face".) The scene cuts to Daffy eating corn while singing "I Dream of Jeanie with the Light Brown Hair" minding his business. A shadow of Meek is shown getting ready to chop off Daffy's head. Then Daffy jumps and shouts "WATCH IT, BUB!!!" directly in his face.

After a brief talk to Meek, he flicks his beak at his face and marches to a hay stack. Meek chops the stack various times and on the last chop, he thinks he kills the duck. Daffy fakes his death by squirting ketchup and throwing his feathers around ("You cwushed my widdle head!"). This fools Meek by pretending he is beheaded and runs rapidly.

Meek feels sad and returns to his house, where Daffy is seen putting many sugar cubes into a cup of coffee. Meek guiltily tells him that he has killed a duck. Daffy cheers up Meek into giving him a cup of coffee and asks how many lumps (of sugar) his wife usually gives him. Meek shows Daffy a 'lump' (a bump on his head), and Daffy hits him on the head (giving him another 'lump') and pours cream on it. Daffy dances on the cakes and pies, singing "Shortenin’ Bread", and Meek immediately recognizes the duck he thought he killed ("Say. That's that Daffy Duck.") Daffy then utters 'YOU AIN'T JUST WHISTLING DIXIE!!!', then throws a pie at him, leading into a war between himself and Meek.

Daffy goes into army plane mode to the strains of the theme song of Captains of the Clouds, by dropping an egg on Meek as a "Secret Bomb Sight." Next, he goes into battle weaponry mode, by making various sounds and smashing household items. After all the fun and games are over, Meek gets mad, which causes the egg to fry on his head.

Daffy runs off, but is caught by Meek with a shotgun. He puts it up to Daffy's face and orders him to get in the oven. Daffy goes into his stripper mode and performs a striptease to the tune "It Had to be You."

The war continues through some parts of the cartoon, including a fortune teller (referring to Jerry Colonna). Going back to the curve run scene, Meek points his gun to Daffy's face again ("No no. Not twice in a same picture."). Meek blows the feathers off him and throws him in the oven. When he hears Daffy screaming in the oven, he feels guilty and opens the door. The cartoon ends with Daffy bathing himself in gravy ("Say. Now you're cooking with gas.")

Crew
Supervision: Robert Clampett
Story: Warren Foster
Animation: Phil Monroe
Additional Animation: Robert McKimson, Rod Scribner, Virgil Ross, Manny Gould, Thomas McKimson, Art Babbitt
Layouts and Backgrounds: Earl Klein and Michael Sasanoff
Voice Actors: Mel Blanc, Darrall Payne
Musical Direction: Carl W. Stalling
Producer: Leon Schlesinger

Home media 
The short is presented uncut on the Looney Tunes Golden Collection: Volume 5 in Disc 3 and on the Looney Tunes Platinum Collection: Volume 2 Blu-ray set, Disc 1.

References

External links 

 
 

1943 animated films
1943 films
Looney Tunes shorts
Daffy Duck films
Films directed by Bob Clampett
1940s American animated films
Films produced by Leon Schlesinger
Films scored by Carl Stalling